Sarong Girl is a 1943 American comedy film directed by Arthur Dreifuss and written by Charles R. Marion, Arthur Hoerl and Tim Ryan. The film stars Ann Corio, Tim Ryan, Irene Ryan, Mantan Moreland, William Henry, Damian O'Flynn and Johnnie Davis. The film was released on June 11, 1943, by Monogram Pictures.

Plot

Cast
Ann Corio as Dixie Barlow
Tim Ryan as Tim Raynor
Irene Ryan as Irene Raynor
Mantan Moreland as Maxwell
William Henry as Jeff Baxter 
Damian O'Flynn as Gil Gailord
Johnnie Davis as Scat Davis 
Gwen Kenyon as Barbara
Henry Kolker as Mr. Jefferson Baxter
Mary Gordon as Mattie
Charles Williams as Mr. Chase 
Betty Blythe as Miss Ellsworth
Lorraine Krueger as Blonde Bridesmaid
Paul Bryar as Jake
Charles Jordan as Sergeant O'Brien

References

External links
 

1943 films
American comedy films
1943 comedy films
Monogram Pictures films
Films directed by Arthur Dreifuss
American black-and-white films
1940s English-language films
1940s American films